Year 130 (CXXX) was a common year starting on Saturday (link will display the full calendar) of the Julian calendar. At the time, it was known as the Year of the Consulship of Catullinus and Aper (or, less frequently, year 883 Ab urbe condita). The denomination 130 for this year has been used since the early medieval period, when the Anno Domini calendar era became the prevalent method in Europe for naming years.

Events 
 By place 
 Roman Empire 
 A law is passed in Rome banning the execution of slaves without a trial. 
 The Temple of Olympian Zeus is completed at Athens. 
 Emperor Hadrian visits the cities Petra and Gerasa (Jerash). 
 A Triumphal Arch for Hadrian is built in Gerasa.
 Construction begins on Canopus, Hadrian's Villa, Tivoli, Italy.

 Asia 
 Huviska becomes king of the Kushan Empire in India. 
 The Scythian king Rudradaman I reconquers the lands annexed by Gautamiputra from the Andhra.

 By topic 
 Arts and sciences 
 Claudius Ptolemaeus tabulates angles of refraction for several media.
 The Antinous Mondragone is sculpted.
 c. 130–138 – Hadrian Hunting Boar and Sacrificing to Apollo, sculptural reliefs on the Arch of Constantine, Rome, are made.
 c. 130–138 – Antinous, from Hadrian's Villa at Tivoli, Italy, is made. It is now kept at Museo Gregoriano Egizio, Rome.

Births 
 December 15 – Lucius Verus, Roman emperor (d. 169)
 Avidius Cassius, Roman general and usurper (d. 175)
 Faustina the Younger, Roman empress 
 Irenaeus, Greek bishop and saint (d. 202)

Deaths 
 October 30 – Antinous, lover of Hadrian (b. 111)
 Carpocrates, religious philosopher
 Juvenal, Roman poet and satirist 
 Marinus of Tyre, Greek cartographer
 Publius Juventius Celsus, Roman jurist (b. AD 67)
 Chu Fu, Chinese occultist
 Emperor Keikō of Japan, according to legend.

References